Alucita pselioxantha is a moth of the family Alucitidae. It is found on Paumotus.

References

Moths described in 1929
Alucitidae
Moths of Oceania
Taxa named by Edward Meyrick